Eryholme railway station, originally named as Dalton Junction, was a railway station located on the East Coast Main Line between Northallerton and Darlington in North Yorkshire, England. It was the point at which the now closed Eryholme-Richmond branch line diverged from the East Coast Main Line.

Passing the site today passengers on the East Coast main Line would be hard pressed to pinpoint the location of Eryholme, as all signs of the station have been demolished.

The station probably saw its greatest number of passengers during World War II as it was the drop off point for servicemen arriving at the nearby RAF Croft. After the war it was also used by railwaymen living in nearby cottages for which trains stopped there but were not advertised in the timetables. This arrangement continued until 1969 when services on the Richmond Branch were withdrawn.

See also
List of closed railway lines in Great Britain
List of closed railway stations in Britain

References

External links
 Eryholme station, SubBrit disused stations project
 Station site on navigable 1947 O. S. map.

Disused railway stations in North Yorkshire
Former North Eastern Railway (UK) stations
Railway stations in Great Britain opened in 1846
Railway stations in Great Britain closed in 1969
1846 establishments in England